Björn Olof Conny Åberg (born 15 April 1968) is a Swedish freestyle skier. He competed in the 1992 Winter Olympics.

References

1968 births
Living people
Freestyle skiers at the 1992 Winter Olympics
Swedish male freestyle skiers
Olympic freestyle skiers of Sweden
People from Östersund
Sportspeople from Jämtland County